Dirty Cop No Donut is a 1999 mockumentary film directed by Tim Ritter.  It follows a corrupt police officer (who is actually a police impersonator) called "Officer Friendly" (Joel D. Wynkoop) as he goes on a rampage.  Released direct-to-video in 1999, it was given a limited theatrical release in 2001, where it received scathing reviews from critics.  A sequel, titled Dirty Cop 2: I Am a Pig, was released in 2001.

Reception
Mainstream critical reaction to Dirty Cop No Donut upon its limited theatrical release in 2001 was overwhelmingly negative, with the film earning a score of 6/100 (indicating "universal dislike or disgust") on Metacritic.  The New York Times called the film a "stomach-turning exercise in gratuitous sadism", while The New York Post remarked that it was "a totally inept and unfunny parody of the TV show 'Cops.'"  The Village Voice considered the film to be "as drunk on fake blood as Friendly is on police power."  TV Guide stated that "overall the project smacks of juvenile hijinks, even though writer/producer/director/cinematographer Tim Ritter has been making films since the mid-'80s."

References

External links

1999 direct-to-video films
1999 films
1990s black comedy films
1990s crime comedy films
American crime comedy films
American black comedy films
American mockumentary films
Films shot in Florida
American exploitation films
Direct-to-video comedy films
American independent films
Films directed by Tim Ritter
1990s English-language films
1990s American films